Zard Kesh is a village in Jirandeh Rural District, Amarlu District, Rudbar County, Gilan Province, Iran. At the 2006 census, its population was 15, in 5 families.

References 

Populated places in Rudbar County